Mărgineni is a commune in Neamț County, Western Moldavia, Romania. It is composed of four villages: Hârțești, Hoisești, Itrinești and Mărgineni.

References 

Communes in Neamț County
Localities in Western Moldavia